Pushkino is the name of several inhabited localities in Russia.

Altai Krai
As of 2010, one rural locality in Altai Krai bears this name:
Pushkino, Altai Krai, a settlement in Rubtsovsky Selsoviet of Rubtsovsky District

Amur Oblast
As of 2010, one rural locality in Amur Oblast bears this name:
Pushkino, Amur Oblast, a selo in Limannovsky Rural Settlement of Seryshevsky District

Astrakhan Oblast
As of 2010, one rural locality in Astrakhan Oblast bears this name:
Pushkino, Astrakhan Oblast, a settlement in Krivobuzansky Selsoviet of Krasnoyarsky District

Republic of Bashkortostan
As of 2012, two rural localities in the Republic of Bashkortostan bear this name:
Pushkino, Blagoveshchensky District, Republic of Bashkortostan, a village in Bedeyevo-Polyansky Selsoviet of Blagoveshchensky District
Pushkino, Nurimanovsky District, Republic of Bashkortostan, a village in Krasnoklyuchevsky Selsoviet of Nurimanovsky District

Bryansk Oblast
As of 2010, two rural localities in Bryansk Oblast bear this name:
Pushkino, Kletnyansky District, Bryansk Oblast, a village in Novotroitsky Selsoviet of Kletnyansky District
Pushkino, Sevsky District, Bryansk Oblast, a selo in Pushkinsky Selsoviet of Sevsky District

Kaliningrad Oblast
As of 2010, three rural localities in Kaliningrad Oblast bear this name:
Pushkino, Bagrationovsky District, Kaliningrad Oblast, a settlement in Dolgorukovsky Rural Okrug of Bagrationovsky District
Pushkino, Nemansky District, Kaliningrad Oblast, a settlement in Zhilinsky Rural Okrug of Nemansky District
Pushkino, Nesterovsky District, Kaliningrad Oblast, a settlement in Prigorodny Rural Okrug of Nesterovsky District

Kaluga Oblast
As of 2010, four rural localities in Kaluga Oblast bear this name:
Pushkino, Iznoskovsky District, Kaluga Oblast, a village in Iznoskovsky District
Pushkino, Medynsky District, Kaluga Oblast, a village in Medynsky District
Pushkino, Peremyshlsky District, Kaluga Oblast, a village in Peremyshlsky District
Pushkino, Yukhnovsky District, Kaluga Oblast, a village in Yukhnovsky District

Kemerovo Oblast
As of 2010, three rural localities in Kemerovo Oblast bear this name:
Pushkino, Mezhdurechensky District, Kemerovo Oblast, a settlement in Sosnovskaya Rural Territory of Mezhdurechensky District
Pushkino, Novokuznetsky District, Kemerovo Oblast, a settlement in Burlakovskaya Rural Territory of Novokuznetsky District
Pushkino, Prokopyevsky District, Kemerovo Oblast, a village in Pushkinskaya Rural Territory of Prokopyevsky District

Khabarovsk Krai
As of 2010, one rural locality in Khabarovsk Krai bears this name:
Pushkino, Khabarovsk Krai, a selo in Bikinsky District

Kirov Oblast
As of 2010, one rural locality in Kirov Oblast bears this name:
Pushkino, Kirov Oblast, a village in Nikolsky Rural Okrug of Yaransky District

Kostroma Oblast
As of 2010, one rural locality in Kostroma Oblast bears this name:
Pushkino, Kostroma Oblast, a village in Minskoye Settlement of Kostromskoy District

Krasnoyarsk Krai
As of 2010, one rural locality in Krasnoyarsk Krai bears this name:
Pushkino, Krasnoyarsk Krai, a village in Turovsky Selsoviet of Abansky District

Kurgan Oblast
As of 2010, one rural locality in Kurgan Oblast bears this name:
Pushkino, Kurgan Oblast, a selo in Pushkinsky Selsoviet of Kurtamyshsky District

Leningrad Oblast
As of 2010, one rural locality in Leningrad Oblast bears this name:
Pushkino, Leningrad Oblast, a village in Osminskoye Settlement Municipal Formation of Luzhsky District

Lipetsk Oblast
As of 2010, one rural locality in Lipetsk Oblast bears this name:
Pushkino, Lipetsk Oblast, a selo in Pushkinsky Selsoviet of Dobrinsky District

Republic of Mordovia
As of 2010, four rural localities in the Republic of Mordovia bear this name:
Pushkino, Saransk, Republic of Mordovia, a settlement under the administrative jurisdiction of  the work settlement of Nikolayevka, under the administrative jurisdiction of the city of republic significance of Saransk
Pushkino, Kadoshkinsky District, Republic of Mordovia, a selo in Pushkinsky Selsoviet of Kadoshkinsky District
Pushkino, Romodanovsky District, Republic of Mordovia, a selo in Pushkinsky Selsoviet of Romodanovsky District
Pushkino, Ruzayevsky District, Republic of Mordovia, a selo in Trusklyaysky Selsoviet of Ruzayevsky District

Moscow Oblast
As of 2010, seven inhabited localities in Moscow Oblast bear this name:
Pushkino, Pushkinsky District, Moscow Oblast, a city in Pushkinsky District
Pushkino, Domodedovo, Moscow Oblast, a rural locality (a village) under the administrative jurisdiction of the Domodedovo Town Under Oblast Jurisdiction
Pushkino, Leninsky District, Moscow Oblast, a rural locality (a village) in Filimonkovskoye Rural Settlement of Leninsky District
Pushkino, Mozhaysky District, Moscow Oblast, a rural locality (a village) in Sputnik Rural Settlement of Mozhaysky District, Moscow Oblast
Pushkino, Noginsky District, Moscow Oblast, a rural locality (a village) in Stepanovskoye Rural Settlement of Noginsky District
Pushkino, Ramensky District, Moscow Oblast, a rural locality (a village) in Konstantinovskoye Rural Settlement of Ramensky District
Pushkino, Voskresensky District, Moscow Oblast, a rural locality (a village) in Ashitkovskoye Rural Settlement of Voskresensky District

Nizhny Novgorod Oblast
As of 2010, one rural locality in Nizhny Novgorod Oblast bears this name:
Pushkino, Nizhny Novgorod Oblast, a settlement in Petrovsky Selsoviet of Pervomaysky District

Omsk Oblast
As of 2010, two rural localities in Omsk Oblast bear this name:
Pushkino, Krutinsky District, Omsk Oblast, a village in Oglukhinsky Rural Okrug of Krutinsky District
Pushkino, Omsky District, Omsk Oblast, a selo in Pushkinsky Rural Okrug of Omsky District

Oryol Oblast
As of 2010, one rural locality in Oryol Oblast bears this name:
Pushkino, Oryol Oblast, a village in Uspensky Selsoviet of Krasnozorensky District

Primorsky Krai
As of 2010, one rural locality in Primorsky Krai bears this name:
Pushkino, Primorsky Krai, a selo under the administrative jurisdiction of Ussuriysk City Under Krai Jurisdiction

Ryazan Oblast
As of 2010, one rural locality in Ryazan Oblast bears this name:
Pushkino, Ryazan Oblast, a selo in Konoplinsky Rural Okrug of Ukholovsky District

Saratov Oblast
As of 2010, one urban locality in Saratov Oblast bears this name:
Pushkino, Saratov Oblast, a work settlement in Sovetsky District

Smolensk Oblast
As of 2010, two rural localities in Smolensk Oblast bear this name:
Pushkino, Safonovsky District, Smolensk Oblast, a village in Pushkinskoye Rural Settlement of Safonovsky District
Pushkino, Vyazemsky District, Smolensk Oblast, a village in Isakovskoye Rural Settlement of Vyazemsky District

Tula Oblast
As of 2010, two rural localities in Tula Oblast bear this name:
Pushkino, Aleksinsky District, Tula Oblast, a selo in Michurinsky Rural Okrug of Aleksinsky District
Pushkino, Shchyokinsky District, Tula Oblast, a village in Lipovskaya Rural Administration of Shchyokinsky District

Tver Oblast
As of 2010, two rural localities in Tver Oblast bear this name:
Pushkino, Kalininsky District, Tver Oblast, a selo in Kalininsky District
Pushkino, Kashinsky District, Tver Oblast, a village in Kashinsky District

Vologda Oblast
As of 2010, three rural localities in Vologda Oblast bear this name:
Pushkino, Glushkovsky Selsoviet, Belozersky District, Vologda Oblast, a village in Glushkovsky Selsoviet of Belozersky District
Pushkino, Gorodishchensky Selsoviet, Belozersky District, Vologda Oblast, a village in Gorodishchensky Selsoviet of Belozersky District
Pushkino, Cherepovetsky District, Vologda Oblast, a village in Ilyinsky Selsoviet of Cherepovetsky District

Yaroslavl Oblast
As of 2010, one rural locality in Yaroslavl Oblast bears this name:
Pushkino, Yaroslavl Oblast, a village in Latskovsky Rural Okrug of Nekouzsky District